Google Feud is a browser-based trivia game featuring answers pulled from Google. It is based on the American show Family Feud, and is unaffiliated with Google.

History
The game was created in 2013 by American indie developer Justin Hook, a writer for Bob's Burgers on Fox, as well as other TV shows and comic books.

Google Feud was demonstrated on @midnight with Chris Hardwick, referenced in the monologue of The Tonight Show Starring Jimmy Fallon, and featured in dozens of other outlets. Time declared it "the online game we didn't know we were waiting for".

In 2017, Google Feud was featured on the Fine Brothers program Celebs React on Fullscreen.

According to Colin McMillen, a staff software engineer at Google, a very similar game was played internally at Google.

Other versions and platforms
 and Alexa.

Controversy
Google Feud became the subject of some controversy for promoting the online game Push Trump Off A Cliff Again!, also created by Hook, after celebrities including John Leguizamo and Rosie O'Donnell promoted the game on their Twitter profiles.

Awards
Google Feud won the "People's Voice" Webby Award for Games in 2016.

References

External links
 

2013 video games
Internet memes introduced in 2013
Browser games
Family Feud
Internet-related controversies
Criticism of Google
Online games
Quiz games
Video games developed in the United States